A city charter or town charter (generically, municipal charter) is a legal document (charter) establishing a municipality such as a city or town.  The concept developed in Europe during the Middle Ages.

Traditionally, the granting of a charter gave a settlement and its inhabitants the right to town privileges under the feudal system.  Townspeople who lived in chartered towns were burghers, as opposed to serfs who lived in villages.  Towns were often "free", in the sense that they were directly protected by the king or emperor, and were not part of a feudal fief.

Today, the process for granting is determined by the type of government of the state in question.  In monarchies, charters are still often a royal charter given by the Crown or the authorities acting on behalf of the Crown.  In federations, the granting of charters may be within the jurisdiction of the lower level of government, such as a province.

Canada

In Canada, charters are granted by provincial authorities.

Germany

Philippines

Since the beginning of American colonial rule, Philippines cities were formally established through laws enacted by the various national legislatures in the country. The Philippine Commission gave the city of Manila its charter in 1901, while the city of Baguio was established by the Philippine Assembly which was composed by elected members instead of appointed ones. During the Commonwealth era, the National Assembly established an additional ten cities. Since achieving independence from the United States in 1946 the Philippine Congress has established 124 more cities, the majority of which required the holding of a plebiscite within the proposed city's jurisdiction to ratify the city's charter.

Sweden 

In Sweden until 1951, cities were established by royal charter.

United Kingdom

In the United Kingdom, cities are established by royal charter.

United States
In the United States, such charters are established either directly by a state legislature by means of local legislation, or indirectly under a general municipal corporation law, usually after the proposed charter has passed a referendum vote of the affected population.

A municipal charter is the basic document that defines the organization, powers, functions and essential procedures of the city government. The charter is, therefore, the most important legal document of any city. Municipalities without charters, in states where such exist, are known as general-law municipalities or cities.

See also
 Town

References

Further reading 
 Winfield, P.H., The charter of San Francisco (The fortnightly review Vol. 157-58:2 (1945), p. 69-75)
 Roger L. Kemp, "Model Government Charters: A City, County, Regional, State, and Federal Handbook" (2007), McFarland and Co., Inc., Jefferson, NC, and London, ENG. 
 Roger L. Kemp "Documents of American Democracy: A Collection of Essential Works," McFarland and Co., Inc., Jefferson, NC, and London, Eng. 

External links

Feudalism
Free imperial cities
Local government in the United Kingdom
Local government in the United States
Medieval law
Urban planning